The Final Stage is a film directed by Frank Howson.

Production
It was based on an early play by Howson and was the seventh film from Boulevard Films and the third which Howson directed. He shot it over two weeks with a cast of six actors on one set.

The movie has been called one of Howson's most personal works.

Fraud Case
Howson later tried to pass the film off as another movie The Boy Who Dared to Dream in order to enable investors to achieve a tax deduction. This was unsuccessful and Howson was convicted of fraud.

References

External links

Australian comedy films
1995 films
1995 comedy films
1990s English-language films
1990s Australian films